Pickel is an unincorporated community in Ste. Genevieve County, in the U.S. state of Missouri.

History
A variant spelling was "Pickle". A post office called Pickle was established in 1898, and remained in operation until 1905. The community was named after William Pickles, the original owner of the town site.

References

Unincorporated communities in Ste. Genevieve County, Missouri
Unincorporated communities in Missouri